Defending champion Rafael Nadal successfully defended his title, defeating David Ferrer in the final, 7–6(7–1), 7–5. It was his record-extending seventh title at the Barcelona Open.

Seeds

Top 9 seeds received a bye into the second round.

Draw

Finals

Top half

Section 1

Section 2

Bottom half

Section 3

Section 4

Qualifying

Seeds

Qualifiers

Lucky losers
  Stéphane Robert
  Evgeny Donskoy
  Arnau Brugués Davi
  Eduardo Schwank

Draw

First qualifier

Second qualifier

Third qualifier

Fourth qualifier

Fifth qualifier

Sixth qualifier

Seventh qualifier

References
 Main Draw
 Qualifying Draw

Singles